The 2022 IHF Women's Junior World Championship was the 23rd edition of the IHF Women's Junior World Championship, held in Slovenia from 22 June to 3 July 2022 under the aegis of International Handball Federation (IHF). For the first time, the championship was organised by the Handball Federation of Slovenia. The number of teams increased from 24 to 32.

Norway won their second title after defeating Hungary in the final, while the Netherlands captured bronze after a win over Sweden.

Bidding process
Two nations entered bid for hosting the tournament:
 
 

North Macedonia later withdrew their bid. The tournament was awarded to Slovenia by the IHF Council in its meeting held in Cairo, Egypt on 28 February 2020.

Qualification

Russia was exluded due to the 2022 Russian invasion of Ukraine.
Paraguay withdrew before the tournament and was replaced with Lithuania.

Venues
Matches were played in Celje and Laško.

 Golovec Hall
 Tri Lilije Hall
 Zlatorog Arena

Draw
The draw was held on 13 April 2022 in Celje, Slovenia.

Seeding

Preliminary round
All times are local (UTC+2).

Group A

Group B

Group C

Group D

Group E

Group F

Group G

Group H

Presidents Cup
Points obtained in the matches between the same teams from the preliminary round were carried over.

Group I

Group II

Group III

Group IV

Placement matches

Bracket
17th place bracket

21st place bracket

25th place bracket

29th place bracket

29th–32nd place semifinals

25–28th place semifinals

21st–24th place semifinals

17–20th place semifinals

31st place game

29th place game

27th place game

25th place game

23rd place game

21st place game

19th place game

17th place game

Main round
Points obtained in the matches between the same teams from the preliminary round were carried over.

Group I

Group II

Group III

Group IV

Knockout stage

Bracket
Championship bracket

5–8th place bracket

9–12th place bracket

13–16th place bracket

Quarterfinals

13–16th place semifinals

9–12th place semifinals

5–8th place semifinals

Semifinals

15th place game

13th place game

Eleventh place game

Ninth place game

Seventh place game

Fifth place game

Third place game

Final

Final ranking

Statistics and awards

Top goalscorers

Source: IHF

Top goalkeepers

Source: IHF

All-Star Team

The all-star team was announced on 3 July 2022.

Notes

References

External links
Official website
IHF website

2022 Women's Junior World Handball Championship
Women's Junior World Handball Championship
2022
Women's handball in Slovenia
Junior World Handball Championship
Women's Junior World Handball Championship
Women's Junior World Handball Championship
2022 in Slovenian women's sport
Sports events affected by the 2022 Russian invasion of Ukraine